Anthony West may refer to:

 Anthony West (author) (1914–1987), British author and literary critic
 Anthony West (motorcyclist) (born 1981), Australian Grand Prix motorcycle road racer
 Anthony C. West (1910–1988), Irish writer
 Anthony R. West (born 1947), British chemist and materials scientist
 Anthony West (musician), in Oh Wonder
 John Anthony West, American author

See also
Tony West (disambiguation)